Luka Dončić (born February 28, 1999) is a Slovenian professional basketball player for the Dallas Mavericks of the National Basketball Association (NBA). He also represents the Slovenian national team.

Born in Ljubljana, Dončić shone as a youth player for Union Olimpija before joining the youth academy of Real Madrid. In 2015 he made his debut for the academy's senior team at age 16, becoming the youngest in club history. He led Madrid to the 2018 EuroLeague title, winning the EuroLeague MVP and the Final Four MVP. Dončić was named the ACB Most Valuable Player and won back-to-back EuroLeague Rising Star and ACB Best Young Player awards. In addition, he was selected to the EuroLeague 2010–20 All-Decade Team.

In 2018, Dončić declared for the NBA draft, joining the Dallas Mavericks. He was selected unanimously to the NBA All-Rookie First Team and won Rookie of the Year for the 2018–19 season. In his next three seasons, he was selected to the NBA All-Star game and named to the All-NBA First Team. He is the Mavericks' franchise leader in career triple-doubles.

Dončić made his senior debut for Slovenia in 2016 at only 17 years of age. He would later help his country win its first EuroBasket title in 2017 while also being named to the All-Tournament Team.

Early life
Dončić was born in Ljubljana to Mirjam Poterbin, an owner of beauty salons, and Saša Dončić, a basketball coach and former player. His mother is Slovenian, and his father is a Slovenian of Serbian descent from Kosovo. His parents filed for divorce in 2008, with custody and legal guardianship granted to his mother.

According to his family, Dončić first touched a basketball when he was seven months old and frequently played with a miniature hoop in his room by age one. He played various sports in his childhood, including football, which he later quit after growing too tall. At age seven, he began playing organized basketball at a primary school in Ljubljana. His opponents at the time were up to ten years old, as Dončić reflected: "I was always training and playing with older kids who had much more experience than me. Many of them were bigger and faster than me too, so I had to beat them with my brain." He admired Greek basketball player Vassilis Spanoulis from his early teenage years, stating that he was "enchanted" by him. He wore the number 7 at Real Madrid in honor of Spanoulis. Dončić also grew up admiring American basketball player LeBron James.

Youth career

Union Olimpija
When Dončić was eight, his father started playing for his hometown club Union Olimpija. Olimpija Basketball School coach Grega Brezovec invited Luka to practice with players his age. Dončić was initially expected to practice with players his age. Still, only 16 minutes into his first training session, the coaching staff moved him to the 11-year-old group. Starting in the next session, he primarily practiced with Olimpija's under-14 team. Still, due to league rules, he only played for the club's under-12 selection team, coming off the bench against opponents three or four years older than him. Despite his exclusion from under-14 games at the time, Dončić often asked to attend practice, even when his coach asked him to stay home.

Representing Olimpija at the under-14 Vasas Intesa Sanpaolo Cup in Budapest in September 2011, Dončić was named the most valuable player (MVP) despite finishing as runners-up to FC Barcelona. In February 2012, he was loaned to Spanish club Real Madrid for the Minicopa Endesa, an under-14 Spanish club competition. Dončić averaged 13.0 points, 4.0 rebounds, 2.8 assists, and 3.3 steals per game to win tournament MVP honors, leading Real Madrid to a second-place finish. In April 2012, he participated in the under-13 Lido di Roma Tournament for Olimpija, finishing as MVP and leading scorer with 34.5 points per game. In the semi-final round of the event against Victoria Fermo, he posted 29 points and 15 rebounds. In a title-clinching win over Lazio, he erupted for 54 points, 11 rebounds, and 10 assists.

Real Madrid

In September 2012, at 13 years of age, Dončić signed a five-year contract with Real Madrid, immediately standing out on the under-16 team with coach Paco Redondo. He moved to Madrid, living with football and basketball prospects. In February 2013, Dončić led Real Madrid to a Minicopa Endesa win, averaging 24.5 points, 13 rebounds, 4 assists, and 6 steals per game. In the tournament's final game, he contributed 25 points, 16 rebounds, and 5 steals to defeat FC Barcelona and win MVP honors. In March, Dončić earned MVP accolades of the under-16 Spain Championship, scoring 25 points in a championship game win over the Gran Canaria youth team.

In the 2014–15 season, Dončić mainly played with Real Madrid's under-18 and reserve teams. He averaged 13.5 points, 5.9 rebounds, and 3.1 assists with the reserve team, helping them win Group B of the Liga EBA, the amateur fourth-division of Spanish basketball. By the end of the season, he earned all-league honorable mention accolades from the basketball website Eurobasket.com. In January 2015, Dončić won the under-18 Ciutat de L'Hospitalet Tournament and was selected to the All-Tournament Team, despite being two years younger than the rest of the team. On January 6, against the youth team of his former club Union Olimpija, he posted a double-double of 13 points, 13 rebounds, 4 assists, and 4 steals. In May 2015, he also won the under-18 Next Generation Tournament, for which he was selected MVP after helping defeat defending champions Crvena zvezda Belgrade in the final.

Professional career

Real Madrid (2015–2018)

Early years (2015–2016)
On April 30, 2015, Dončić made his professional debut for Real Madrid in the Liga ACB against Unicaja, making his only three-point attempt in under 2 minutes of playing time. At 16 years, two months, and two days of age, he became the youngest player to ever play for Real Madrid in the ACB and the third-youngest debutant in league history, behind only Ricky Rubio and Ángel Rebolo. He played five games in the 2014–15 ACB season, averaging 1.6 points and 1.2 rebounds in 4.8 minutes per game.

In the 2015–16 season, Dončić became a regular member of Real Madrid's senior team. He played against the Boston Celtics in an NBA preseason game on October 8, 2015, collecting 4 rebounds, 1 assist, and 1 block. On October 16, at age 16, he debuted in the EuroLeague, scoring 2 points in a loss to Khimki. Dončić became the 21st player ever to debut in the EuroLeague before turning 17. On October 18, he recorded 10 points and 4 rebounds in a 94–61 win over Gipuzkoa. On November 29, Dončić posted a season-high 15 points, 6 rebounds, and 4 assists against Bilbao. With the performance, he set a new ACB record for most points and the highest Performance Index Rating (PIR) in a game for players under age 17. He scored 12 points and grabbed 5 rebounds on January 7, 2016, against CSKA Moscow in the EuroLeague. After a Real Madrid time-out in the second quarter of the game, Dončić made three consecutive three-pointers, recording 9 points in 2 minutes. Through 39 games in the 2015–16 ACB season, he averaged 4.5 points, 2.6 rebounds, and 1.7 assists. In 12 EuroLeague games, he recorded 3.5 points, 2.3 rebounds, and 2 assists per game.

Rise to prominence (2016–2017)

Dončić made his 2016–17 season debut on September 30, 2016, against Unicaja, recording 6 points and 4 assists in 19 minutes. He collected 3 points, 5 rebounds, and 4 assists in an NBA preseason win on October 3, 2016, over the Oklahoma City Thunder. On December 4, he posted a double-double of 23 points and 11 assists, both season-highs, in a 92–76 win over Montakit Fuenlabrada. The game earned him his first ACB player of the week honor. Dončić scored a team-high 17 points in a EuroLeague victory over Žalgiris Kaunas on December 8, 2016. After recording 16 points, 6 rebounds, 5 assists, and 3 steals in a 95–72 win over Brose Bamberg on December 22, he was named MVP of the Round in the EuroLeague, becoming the youngest player ever to do so. He earned the same honor on January 14, 2017, after posting 10 points, 11 rebounds, and 8 assists to help beat Maccabi Tel Aviv. On February 9, Dončić recorded 5 points, 7 rebounds, and 11 assists to defeat UNICS Kazan. He scored a season-high 23 points on February 18, in the Spanish King's Cup versus Baskonia. After scoring 13 points and grabbing 8 rebounds in the 2017 EuroLeague Playoffs against Darüşşafaka on April 26, he shared MVP of the Round accolades with two other players. Two days later, he won the award outright, posting 11 points, 5 rebounds, and 7 assists to lead Real Madrid to a EuroLeague Final Four berth. Through 42 ACB games in the season, Dončić averaged 7.5 points, 4.4 rebounds, and 3 assists. Through 35 EuroLeague contests, he averaged 7.8 points, 4.5 rebounds, and 4.2 assists per game. He was named EuroLeague Rising Star by a unanimous vote and claimed the ACB Best Young Player Award.

MVP season (2017–2018)
Dončić assumed a more significant role for Real Madrid entering the 2017–18 season after the team's star player Sergio Llull suffered a torn ACL during EuroBasket 2017. In his season debut on October 1, 2017, he recorded 8 points, 6 rebounds, and 4 assists in a 94–88 victory over MoraBanc Andorra. On October 12, Dončić scored a career-high 27 points in his first EuroLeague game of the season to help defeat Anadolu Efes. He nearly recorded a triple-double against Valencia in his next game, with 16 points, 10 assists, and 7 rebounds. On October 24, Dončić was named EuroLeague MVP of the Round after erupting for 27 points, 8 rebounds, 5 assists, and 3 steals. He was named MVP of the Round again two days later, eclipsing his career-best with 28 points in an 87–66 win over Žalgiris Kaunas. Dončić also grabbed 9 rebounds and had 4 assists in the game. At the end of October, he earned EuroLeague MVP of the Month honors, becoming the youngest player to win the award. On December 8, he set a career-high in scoring with 33 points, 6 rebounds, and 4 assists against Olympiacos Piraeus. Dončić led Real Madrid to a 79–77 victory over defending EuroLeague champion Fenerbahçe Doğuş on December 28, contributing 20 points, 10 assists, and 8 rebounds. Following a 24-point outburst versus Movistar Estudiantes on December 31, he was selected as Player of the Round in the ACB. He was later named ACB Player of the Month for December, becoming the award's youngest recipient.

On February 9, 2018, Dončić led his team with 27 points in a losing effort to Olympiacos, 80–79. He had another strong performance on February 17, versus Iberostar Tenerife in the 2018 Spanish King's Cup, posting 17 points, 7 rebounds, 5 assists, and 4 steals. On March 30, 2018, Dončić scored 24 points, grabbed 9 rebounds, and made a game-winning three-pointer under a second left in regulation to beat Crvena zvezda Belgrade, 82–79. On May 9, he recorded 17 points, 10 rebounds, and 10 assists in 22 minutes against Real Betis Energía Plus, for the first triple-double in the ACB since the 2006–07 season, seventh in league history. Dončić finished with 16 points, 7 rebounds, and 2 assists on May 18, in a 92–83 win over CSKA Moscow in the EuroLeague semi-finals. On May 20, he guided Real Madrid to a EuroLeague finals victory over Fenerbahçe Doğuş. He was subsequently named EuroLeague Final Four MVP after scoring 15 points. Dončić won the EuroLeague MVP award, being its youngest winner, after averaging 16 points, 4.9 rebounds, and 4.3 assists per game over 33 EuroLeague games and leading the league in PIR. He also repeated as the EuroLeague Rising Star, becoming the third back-to-back winner. Also, Dončić earned the ACB Best Young Player and MVP accolades after helping his team defeat Kirolbet Baskonia in the league finals. On June 29, 2018, he parted ways with Real Madrid.

Accolades
In November 2019, Dončić was nominated to the EuroLeague 2010–20 All-Decade Team. In March 2020, he was selected for the 2010–20 All-Decade Team.

On March 23, 2021, the Real Madrid Football Club named Dončić and Spanish rally driver Carlos Sainz Sr. as honorary members, which is the highest distinction award of the club. The decision was made by the Real Madrid board of directors chaired by Florentino Pérez.

Dallas Mavericks (2018–present)

Rookie of the Year (2018–2019)

On June 21, 2018, Dončić was selected with the third overall pick by the Atlanta Hawks in the 2018 NBA draft. He was then traded to the Dallas Mavericks in exchange for the draft rights to Trae Young and a protected future first-round pick in 2019. After the draft, Mavericks head coach Rick Carlisle said, "At one point, we thought there might be a slight chance Dončić could fall to us, but a couple of days ago it was pretty clear that there was no way that was going to happen. He's just too good. We get a guy we think is franchise foundation piece." He signed his rookie contract with the Mavericks on July 9, 2018. Dončić did not play at the 2018 NBA Summer League due to his late buyout from Real Madrid. Before the 2018–19 season, ESPN considered him the favorite to win the NBA Rookie of the Year Award.

Dončić made his regular-season debut on October 17, 2018, recording 10 points, 8 rebounds, and 4 assists in a 121–100 loss to the Phoenix Suns. On October 20, Dončić recorded 26 points and 6 rebounds in a 140–136 win over the Minnesota Timberwolves. He became the youngest 20-point scorer in Mavericks history. On October 29, Dončić posted 31 points and 8 rebounds in a 113–108 loss to the San Antonio Spurs for his first 30-point game in the NBA. He recorded his first NBA double-double on November 19, with 15 points and 10 rebounds in a 98–88 loss to the Memphis Grizzlies. Dončić was named NBA Rookie of the Month in the Western Conference for November 2018. On December 8, Dončić scored 21 points in a 107–104 win over the Houston Rockets. After initial struggles, he produced a personal 11–0 run in the game's final minutes. On December 28, Dončić scored 34 points and became the youngest NBA player to make seven three-pointers in a game. He was named Western Conference Rookie of the Month for December 2018. On January 21, Dončić recorded his first NBA triple-double with 18 points, 11 rebounds, and 10 assists in a 116–106 loss to the Milwaukee Bucks. The performance made him the third-youngest player in NBA history to accomplish the feat at 19 years and 327 days old, behind LaMelo Ball and Markelle Fultz. On January 27, Dončić scored a season-high 35 points and recorded his second NBA triple-double adding 12 rebounds and 10 assists in a 123–120 loss to the Toronto Raptors. He became the first teenager in NBA history with a 30-point triple-double and multiple triple-doubles. Two days later, Dončić was named a confirmed participant for the World Team representing Slovenia in the 2019 Rising Stars Challenge. Despite being second in fan voting, behind only LeBron James, and ranked 8th in the total voting score, Dončić wasn't selected for the Western Conference All-Stars in the 2019 NBA All-Star Game.

On February 6, Dončić recorded his third triple-double with 19 points, 10 rebounds, and 11 assists in a 99–93 win over the Charlotte Hornets, which made him the youngest player in NBA history to record three triple-doubles. He edges Hall of Famer Magic Johnson by 117 days. On February 25, Dončić recorded his fourth triple-double with 28 points, 10 rebounds, and 10 assists in a 121–112 loss to the Los Angeles Clippers. Dončić was named Western Conference Rookie of the Month for January 2019. His eight triple-doubles ranked fourth on the season behind Russell Westbrook (34), Nikola Jokić (12), and Ben Simmons (10), as well as tied with LeBron James. Dončić became just the fifth player in NBA history to average at least 20 points, 5 rebounds and 5 assists in his rookie year, joining Oscar Robertson (1960–61), Michael Jordan (1984–85), LeBron James (2003–04), and Tyreke Evans (2009–10). In May, Dončić was selected unanimously to the All-Rookie First Team. In June, he received the NBA Rookie of the Year Award. Dončić became the second European player, after Pau Gasol, to win the award and the sixth overall winner not born in the United States.

First All-Star and playoff appearance (2019–2020)
Dončić made his first triple-double of the season on October 25, 2019, posting 25 points, 10 rebounds, and 10 assists to help the Mavericks defeat the New Orleans Pelicans 123–116. In two consecutive games, on November 1–3, he recorded two triple-doubles and matched a career-high 15 assists in both games. On November 8, Dončić scored a career-high 38 points and recorded his twelfth NBA triple-double by adding 14 rebounds and 10 assists in a 106–102 loss to the New York Knicks. Ten days later, in a 117–110 win over the San Antonio Spurs, Dončić recorded a then-career-high 42 points and his sixth triple-double of the season by adding 11 rebounds and 12 assists. He made NBA history in a 142–94 win over the Golden State Warriors on November 20, when he posted 35 points, 10 rebounds, and 11 assists. He became the youngest player to have 35-point triple-doubles in succession, breaking Oscar Robertson's record. He was the fourth player to do so since the 1983–84 season, joining Michael Jordan, James Harden, and Russell Westbrook. In November, Dončić was named the NBA Western Conference Player of the Week for Week 5 (November 18–24), his first NBA Player of the Week award. On December 3, he won his first NBA Player of the Month award when he was named the NBA Western Conference Player of the Month for October and November. He became the youngest Western Conference Player of the Month winner since the league began issuing the award by conferences in the 2001–02 season. In December, he was named Sports Illustrated 2019 Breakout of the Year. On December 8, 2019, Dončić surpassed the record for the most consecutive games with at least 20 points, 5 rebounds, and 5 assists since the ABA-NBA merger in 1976. Michael Jordan previously held the record with 18 straight games in 1989. Dončić recorded his tenth triple-double of the season on January 4, 2020, posting 39 points, 12 rebounds, and 10 assists in a 123–120 loss to the Charlotte Hornets.

During the 2019–20 season, Dončić was selected to his first NBA All-Star Game as a Western Conference starter. He became the youngest European player to start in an All-Star game. On March 4, Dončić recorded his 22nd career triple-double, passing Jason Kidd for the most in Mavericks history. He registered 30 points, 17 rebounds, and 10 assists in a 127–123 overtime victory over the New Orleans Pelicans. Dončić recorded his 15th triple-double of the season on July 31, posting 28 points, 13 rebounds, and 10 assists in a 153–149 overtime loss to the Houston Rockets. On August 4, Dončić recorded another triple-double with 34 points, 12 assists, and a career-high 20 rebounds in a 114–110 overtime win over the Sacramento Kings. With that, he became the youngest player to record 30+ points, 20+ rebounds, and 10 or more assists. On August 8, Dončić had a then-career-high 19 assists, which tied LeBron James for an NBA season-high, 36 points, 14 rebounds, and 2 turnovers in a 136–132 win against the Milwaukee Bucks. The game marked his 17th triple-double of the season and clinched his spot as the youngest player to lead the NBA in triple-doubles. On August 15, he was selected to the NBA's All-Seeding Games First Team for his play in the eight seeding games, where he averaged 30.0 points, 10.1 rebounds, and 9.7 assists per game. Dončić finished as one of the three finalists for the NBA Most Improved Player Award. He finished third behind eventual winner Brandon Ingram and second place Bam Adebayo. On August 17, Dončić made his NBA Playoffs debut, scoring 42 points (most ever in an NBA playoffs debut) in a 110–118 loss to the Los Angeles Clippers. On August 23, he became the youngest player in NBA postseason history with a 40-point triple-double, scoring 43 points in a 135–133 overtime victory over the LA Clippers.  With that performance, he became just the second player in NBA history to record at least 43 points, 17 rebounds, and 13 assists in any game, joining Wilt Chamberlain as the other. On September 16, he was named to the All-NBA First Team. He became the first player since Tim Duncan in the 1998–99 season to be selected to an All-NBA First Team in a first or second season. He finished fourth overall in the season's final MVP results. He also became the second-youngest player ever to finish in the top five of MVP voting.

First division title and second All-NBA First Team (2020–2021)

On February 6, 2021, Dončić matched his then-career-high 42 points while putting up 11 assists and seven rebounds in a 134–132 win over the Golden State Warriors. On February 12, Dončić logged a career-high 46 points with 12 assists, 8 rebounds,  one block, and one steal in a 143–130 win over the New Orleans Pelicans. On May 1, Dončić recorded 31 points, 12 rebounds, and a career-high 20 assists in a 125–124 victory over the Washington Wizards. With that performance, he became just the fourth player in NBA history to record a 30-point triple-double with at least 20 assists, joining Oscar Robertson, Magic Johnson, and Russell Westbrook. On May 7, he reached 5,000 points for his career. At the age of 22 years 68 days old, Dončić became the fourth-youngest player to achieve the feat, trailing only LeBron James, Kevin Durant, and Carmelo Anthony. On May 22,  he recorded 31 points, 10 rebounds, and 11 assists in a 113–103 victory over the Los Angeles Clippers in Game 1 of the 2021 NBA Playoffs. He became the first player in NBA history to have three triple-doubles in their first seven career postseason games. He also passed Kareem Abdul-Jabbar as the youngest player in NBA history to record a playoff triple-double on the road. On May 28, he scored a then playoff career-high 44 points in a 118–108 loss in Game 3 of the Western Conference First Round against the Los Angeles Clippers. On June 6, in Dončić’s first Game 7, he surpassed his playoff career-high with 46 points and 14 assists. The Mavericks fell short 126–111 and were eliminated in the First Round for the second consecutive season, despite leading the series 2–0. On June 15, he was selected to his second consecutive All-NBA First Team. Like the previous year, he became the first player since Tim Duncan to be selected twice to the All-NBA First Team in their first three seasons and just the sixth to do so since the ABA–NBA merger, joining David Thompson, Larry Bird, David Robinson, and Anfernee Hardaway.

First Western Conference Finals appearance (2021–2022)
On August 10, 2021, he signed a five-year $207 million rookie extension, the largest in NBA history. On February 3, Dončić was named as a reserve for the 2022 NBA All-Star Game. On February 5, Dončić logged his 44th career triple-double with 33 points, 13 rebounds, 15 assists, and two steals in a 107–98 win against the Philadelphia 76ers, overtaking Fat Lever for 10th on the all-time career triple-double list. On February 10, Dončić scored 28 of his career-high 51 points in the first quarter, grabbed nine rebounds, and dished out six assists on 17-of-26 shooting from the field, including seven three-pointers, in a 112–105 win against the Los Angeles Clippers. On February 13, in a back-to-back against the Clippers, Dončić scored 23 of his 45 points in the fourth quarter, grabbed 15 rebounds, and dished out 8 assists in a 99–97 loss. With 96 points in the two games, Dončić had the most in a two-game span against the same opponent since Wilt Chamberlain scored 100 for Philadelphia against Seattle in December 1967. For his performances against the Clippers, he was named Western Conference Player of the Week. On February 18, Dončić scored 49 points, including seven three-pointers, to go along with 15 rebounds and 8 assists in a 125–118 win over the New Orleans Pelicans. He became the fourth player in NBA history to record multiple 45-point, 15-rebound, and five-assist games in a calendar month, as well as the first player to record at least 40 points, fifteen rebounds, five assists, five three-pointers, and a plus/minus of +20 in the same game.

On February 27, Dončić recorded 34 points, and 11 rebounds, leading the Mavericks back from 21 down in the third quarter against the Golden State Warriors in a 107–101 win. Dončić became the first player in NBA history to average 30 points, 10 rebounds, and 8 assists per game while shooting at least 40 percent from three-point range in a calendar month in the three-point era since 1980. On March 3, Dončić won his second career NBA Player of the Month award when he was named the NBA Western Conference Player of the Month for February; he is the second Maverick to win this award multiple times, joined by Dirk Nowitzki, who won it six times in his career. On March 29, Dončić logged his 46th career triple-double with 34 points (25 points in the first half), 12 rebounds, and 12 assists in a 128–110 win over the Los Angeles Lakers.

Dončić missed the first three games of the playoffs because of an injury in the final regular season game. On April 28, Dončić led the Dallas Mavericks to a 98–96 Game 6 win over the Utah Jazz to close the first-round series. It was the first time Dallas had advanced to the postseason's second round in Dončić's four-year NBA career. It was also the first time Mavericks won in the first round since winning the 2011 NBA Finals. On May 2, in Game 1 of the Western Conference Semi-finals, Dončić posted 45 points, 12 rebounds, and 8 assists in a 121–114 loss against the Phoenix Suns. On May 15, Dončić recorded 35 points, 10 rebounds, 4 assists, and 2 steals in three-quarters in a 123–90 Game 7 win against the overall one-seed Suns, securing the Mavericks a place in the Western Conference Finals. On May 20, during Game 2 of the Western Conference Finals, Dončić posted 42 points, 5 rebounds, 8 assists, and 3 steals in a 126–117 loss against the Golden State Warriors. He joined Michael Jordan (917) & Wilt Chamberlain (867) as the only players in NBA History with 800 points through their first 25 career playoff games. Dončić also tied Dirk Nowitzki for the most 40+ point games in Mavericks playoff history with seven. Two days later, Dončić surpassed Dirk Nowitzki in 40-point playoff games with a double-double of 40 points (21 in the fourth quarter) and 11 rebounds in a 109–100 Game 3 loss. According to Elias Sports Bureau, he led Dallas in points, rebounds, and assists ten times during the playoffs - the most ever in a single postseason. On May 24, Dončić was selected to his third All-NBA First Team, becoming the third player since the merger to do so in their first four years, joining Tim Duncan and Larry Bird.

2022–2023 season
On October 22, 2022, Dončić recorded 32 points, seven rebounds, and 10 assists in a 137–96 victory against the Memphis Grizzlies. In the game, he became the fourth player since the merger to record 7,000 career points in less than 270 games, joining Michael Jordan, Shaquille O'Neal, and LeBron James. On October 27, Dončić recorded a triple-double with 41 points, 11 rebounds, and 14 assists in a 129–125 overtime win over the Brooklyn Nets. The game marked his 22nd career 30-point triple-double, passing Wilt Chamberlain for fifth-most in NBA history. On October 30, he scored a game-high 44 points in a 114–105 win over the Orlando Magic, becoming the first player in NBA history to record 200+ points, 50+ rebounds, and 50+ assists through the first six games of a season. Dončić also became the sixth player in NBA history to score at least 30 points in each of the first six games of a season and the first to do so since Michael Jordan in the 1986–87 season. On November 2, in a 103–100 victory against the Utah Jazz, Dončić scored 33 points and became the first player since Wilt Chamberlain in 1962–63 to score at least 30 points in each of the first seven games of a season. In the next game, Dončić recorded 35 points, eight rebounds, six assists, and three steals in a 111–110 win over the Toronto Raptors. He became the only other NBA player to score 30 or more points in the first eight games of a season beside Wilt Chamberlain, who did it in the first eight of the 1959–60 season and the first 23 of the 1962–63 season. 

On November 18, Dončić recorded his 50th career triple-double with 33 points, 12 rebounds, and 11 assists in a 127–99 victory over the Denver Nuggets. In doing so, Dončić became the second-fastest player to record 50 triple-doubles, needing 278 career games, only trailing Oscar Robertson (111) and one fewer game than Magic Johnson (279). On November 23, Dončić scored a game-high 42 points along with 8 rebounds and 9 assists in a 125–112 loss against the Boston Celtics. He became the second-fastest player in NBA history (in terms of games played) to reach 7,500-plus points, 2,000-plus rebounds, and 2,000-plus assists, trailing only Oscar Robertson, who accomplished the feat in 254 games compared to the Dončić’s 280 outings. On November 29, Dončić recorded his 51st career triple-double with 41 points, 12 rebounds and 12 assists in a 116–113 win over the reigning champions Golden State Warriors. It was the fifth 40-point triple-double of his career, ranking behind only Oscar Robertson  (22), James Harden (16), Russell Westbrook (13), Wilt Chamberlain (7), and Lebron James (6) in NBA history. Dončić also tied Dirk Nowitzki for the second-most 40-point outings in Mavericks history (20), trailing only Mark Aguirre (22). 

On December 23, Dončić put up 50 points, eight rebounds, and 10 assists in a 112–106 win over the Houston Rockets. He joined Dirk Nowitzki as the only player to record multiple 50-point games in Mavericks history. On December 27, Dončić set a career-high in points (60) and rebounds (21) and became the first player in NBA history to record a 60-point, 20-rebound triple-double in a 126–121 victory over the New York Knicks and the first player since James Harden to record a 60-point triple-double, the second in NBA history. Dončić also became just the third player in NBA history to record a 50-point, 20-rebound triple-double, joining Elgin Baylor and Chamberlain. His 60 points were also the most scored in Mavericks history, previously held by Nowitzki (53), and surpassed Nowitzki for the most 50-point games in Mavericks history. On December 31, Dončić recorded 51 points, six rebounds, nine assists and four steals in a 126–125 win over the San Antonio Spurs. He became the first player in NBA history to record 250+ points, 50+ rebounds, and 50+ assists over a five-game span. Dončić also surpassed Mark Aguirre for the most 40-point games in Mavericks history with 23. 

On January 3, 2023, Dončić was awarded the Western Conference Player of the Month award for his play during the month of December, the third of his career. On January 12, Dončić recorded his 10th triple-double of the season with 35 points, 14 rebounds and 13 assists playing a career-high 53 minutes in a 119–115 double overtime win over the Los Angeles Lakers. He hit tying 3-pointers in the final seconds of regulation and the first overtime. On January 26, Dončić was named a Western Conference starter for the 2023 NBA All-Star Game, marking his fourth consecutive selection. On January 30, Dončić scored 53 points on 17-of-24 shooting from the field in a 111–105 win over the Detroit Pistons, marking his fifth career 50-point game. He tied LeBron James for the second-most 50-point games in a player's first five seasons in the NBA with five, trailing Michael Jordan's record of 17 since the ABA–NBA merger. On March 2, Dončić had 42 points and 12 assists in a 133–126 victory over the Philadelphia 76ers. In the same game his teammate Kyrie Irving scored 40 points and it was the first time in Dallas franchise history that two players scored 40 points in the same game.

National team career

Junior national team

Dončić was set to play at the Division B tournament of the 2014 FIBA Europe Under-16 Championship but was forced to withdraw from the tournament with a knee injury. In December 2014, he participated in a friendly tournament in Székesfehérvár, Hungary, averaging 35.3 points and 7.6 rebounds per game while shooting 81 percent on two-pointers and 57 percent on three-pointers.

Senior national team

EuroBasket 2017
On September 22, 2016, Dončić announced that he would represent the senior men's Slovenian national team for the rest of his career. He was previously linked with several other national teams, including Serbia and Spain. His national team roommate became Goran Dragić, whom he met at age seven and has been cited as his mentor and friend.

Dončić was a Slovenian squad member for EuroBasket 2017, where his country won its first gold medal after going undefeated (9–0) in the tournament. In Slovenia's 103–97 win over Latvia in the quarter-finals, he scored 27 points and grabbed 9 rebounds. He recorded 11 points, 12 rebounds, and 8 assists, in the 92–72 semi-final win over Spain. In the final, Slovenia won by a score of 93–85 over Serbia. He had 8 points and 7 rebounds, before falling out of the game, due to an injury, in the game's third quarter. Dončić was also named to the competition's All-Tournament Team, joining teammate Goran Dragić, who was voted the EuroBasket MVP.

2020 Summer Olympics
During the 2020 FIBA Men's Olympic Qualifying Tournament in Kaunas, Lithuania, Dončic led Slovenia to its first-ever Olympic berth.  Dončić won MVP of the tournament by leading Slovenia to a 96–85 victory over Lithuania while recording 31 points, 11 rebounds, and 13 assists in the final round.

In his Olympic debut on July 26, 2021, Dončić scored 48 points in a 118–100 victory over Argentina. His 48-point performance tied for the second-highest men's point total in a single game in Summer Olympics history and marked the most in a men's basketball debut. In the semi-final match-up versus France, Dončić posted the third triple-double in Olympic men's basketball history with 16 points, 10 rebounds, and 18 assists in a 90–89 loss. Also, it ended his 17-match winning streak from the senior national team debut back in 2017. Slovenia ended up losing the bronze medal match versus Australia 107–93. For his play during the tournament, Dončić was selected to the FIBA All-Star Five team, joining Patty Mills, Ricky Rubio, Kevin Durant, and Rudy Gobert as the five best players at the Games.

EuroBasket 2022
During the tournament's group stage, Dončić scored 47 points as he led Slovenia to the Round of 16 with a 88–82 victory over France, claiming the top spot in Group B. His 47-point performance was the second-highest scoring total in EuroBasket history. It was the most points scored by any player in EuroBasket history in the last 65 years. On September 10, he scored 35 points while beating Belgium 88–72 to advance to the quarter-finals. The game marked his third consecutive game scoring 30+ points, becoming the first player in tournament history in 30 years to do so. Slovenia was eventually upset by Poland 90–87 in the quarter-finals.

Player profile

Dončić has frequently been described as a "position-less guard" with attributes of a point guard, shooting guard, and small forward. Standing  and weighing , he has been praised for his exceptional size and strength for the guard position. Dallas Mavericks executive Donnie Nelson lauded his "point forward ability" and sports website The Ringer labeled him a "legitimate point guard with the size of a small-ball power forward."

Since his early years with Real Madrid, Dončić was tabbed as one of Europe's premier talents, with Spanish newspaper Marca giving him the nickname "El Niño Maravilla" (The Wonder Boy). Entering the 2018 NBA draft, he was widely seen as one of the best and most accomplished European prospects of his generation. Slam magazine considered Dončić the "best international prospect ever," and sports website SB Nation called him "most accomplished NBA prospect in decades." An anonymous NBA veteran scouting executive said that his game was "leap years above anyone" in his draft class.

Dončić is versatile on the offensive end, displaying proficiency in shooting three-pointers, mid-range jump shots, floaters, and shots in the post. His basketball IQ, intangibles, and skills have been considered his primary assets, and he is seen as an elite facilitator, especially on the pick and roll. NBA and EuroLeague coach Ettore Messina called him "phenomenal, especially mentally" for his age. His lack of lateral quickness to stay in front of most NBA point guards and wings has been labeled one of his main flaws. Dallas Mavericks head coach Rick Carlisle refuted some of the worries regarding Dončić's athleticism, stating that "for a 19-year-old, he's got a really unusual combination of size, speed, and deceptive quickness." By his second year, Luka's ability to accelerate off a pick and blow by defenders to get to the basket is seen as one of his strengths. Given the false characterisation of his abilities and his subsequent success in the NBA, some speculate that prejudiced stereotyping might have had a role in his negative pre-draft evaluation.

Before his draft, basketball journalist and scout Austin Green compared Dončić to NBA players Paul Pierce and Joe Johnson. Dončić compared himself to Ben Simmons due to his versatility. In his second season, LA Clippers coach Doc Rivers, when asked about Dončić, stated that "there's a lot of people in him." He likened Dončić’s stepback 3-pointers to James Harden, his passing ability to Larry Bird, and his court vision to LeBron James. NBA analyst, Kendrick Perkins, called him "baby LeBron" due to his overall skill and dominance on the court.

In December 2019, San Antonio Spurs coach Gregg Popovich called Dončić's playing style "Magic Johnson-like" because "he sees the floor in that same way." In August 2020, head coach Rick Carlisle compared Dončić’s playmaking and court vision to Larry Bird and Jason Kidd. Milwaukee Bucks forward Giannis Antetokounmpo called Dončić "one of the most talented guys I've ever played against." During his first career playoff game versus the LA Clippers, TV analyst and former point guard Mark Jackson, reiterated his view of Dončić, calling him "an absolute combination of Magic Johnson and Larry Bird."

Career statistics

NBA

Regular season

|-
| style="text-align:left;"| 
| style="text-align:left;"| Dallas
| 72 || 72 || 32.2 || .427 || .327 || .713 || 7.8 || 6.0 || 1.1 || .3 || 21.2
|-
| style="text-align:left;"| 
| style="text-align:left;"| Dallas
| 61 || 61 || 33.6 || .463 || .316 || .758 || 9.4 || 8.8 || 1.0 || .2 || 28.8
|-
| style="text-align:left;"| 
| style="text-align:left;"| Dallas
| 66 || 66 || 34.3 || .479 || .350 || .730 || 8.0 || 8.6 || 1.0 || .5 || 27.7
|-
| style="text-align:left;"| 
| style="text-align:left;"| Dallas
| 65 || 65 || 35.4 || .457 || .353 || .744 || 9.1 || 8.7 || 1.2 || .6 || 28.4
|- class="sortbottom"
| style="text-align:center;" colspan="2"| Career
| 264 || 264 || 33.8 || .457 || .337 || .737 || 8.5 || 8.0 || 1.1 || .4 || 26.4
|- class="sortbottom"
| style="text-align:center;" colspan="2"| All-Star
| 4 || 3 || 23.2 || .458 || .333 || – || 1.5 || 5.0 || .3 || .0 || 7.0

Playoffs

|-
| style="text-align:left;"| 
| style="text-align:left;"| Dallas
| 6 || 6 || 35.8 || .500 || .364 || .656 || 9.8 || 8.7 || 1.2 || .5 || 31.0
|-
| style="text-align:left;"|
| style="text-align:left;"|Dallas
| 7 || 7 || 40.1 || .490 || .408 || .529 || 7.9 || 10.3 || 1.3 || .4 || 35.7
|-
| style="text-align:left;"| 
| style="text-align:left;"| Dallas
| 15 || 15 || 36.8 || .455 || .345 || .770 || 9.8 || 6.4 || 1.8 || .6 || 31.7
|- class="sortbottom"
| style="text-align:center;" colspan="2"|Career 
| 28 || 28 || 37.4 || .473 || .366 || .692 || 9.3 || 7.9 || 1.5 || .5 || 32.5

EuroLeague

|-
| style="text-align:left;"| 2015–16
| style="text-align:left;"| Real Madrid
| 12 || 0 || 11.1 || .407 || .313 || .882 || 2.3 || 2.0 || .2 || .3 || 3.5 || 6.2
|-
| style="text-align:left;"| 2016–17
| style="text-align:left;"| Real Madrid
| 35 || 15 || 19.9 || .433 || .371 || .844 || 4.5 || 4.2 || .9 || .2 || 7.8 || 13.3
|-
| style="text-align:left;background:#AFE6BA;"| 2017–18
| style="text-align:left;"| Real Madrid
| 33 || 17 || 25.9 || .451 || .329 || .816 || 4.8 || 4.3 || 1.1 || .3 || 16.0 || style="background:#cfecec;"|21.5
|- class="sortbottom"
| colspan=2 style="text-align:center;"| Career
| 80 || 32 || 21.0 || .443 || .344 || .828 || 4.3 || 3.9 || .9 || .3 || 10.6 || 15.6

Liga ACB
Cited from ACB.com

|-
| style="text-align:left;background:#AFE6BA;"| 2014–15
| style="text-align:left;"| Real Madrid
| 5 || 0 || 4.8 || .427 || .333 || .750 || 1.2 || .0 || .0 || .0 || 1.6 || 1.8
|-
| style="text-align:left;background:#AFE6BA;"| 2015–16
| style="text-align:left;"| Real Madrid
| 39 || 0 || 12.9 || .526 || .392 || .708 || 2.6 || 1.7 || .4 || .3 || 4.5 || 5.9
|-
| style="text-align:left;"| 2016–17
| style="text-align:left;"| Real Madrid
| 42 || 11 || 19.8 || .441 || .295 || .785 || 4.4 || 3.0 || .6 || .3 || 7.5 || 11.9
|-
| style="text-align:left;background:#AFE6BA;"| 2017–18
| style="text-align:left;"| Real Madrid
| 37 || 21 || 24.3 || .462 || .293 || .752 || 5.7 || 4.7 || 1.1 || .4 || 12.5 || 18.4
|- class="sortbottom"
| colspan=2 style="text-align:center;"| Career
| 123 || 32 || 18.3 || .463 || .310 || .754 || 4.1 || 3.0 || .7 || .3 || 7.8 || 11.6

Slovenia

|-
! colspan=14 | EuroBasket
|-
| style="text-align:left;"| 2022
| style="text-align:left;"| Slovenia
| 7 || 7 || 33.2 || .496 || .322 || .702 || 7.7 || 6.6 || 2.0 || .6 || 26.0 || 27.1
|-
! colspan=14 | Olympics
|-
| style="text-align:left;"| 2020 || style="text-align:left;"|  Slovenia || 6 || 6 || 32.7 || .449 || .304 || .714 || 9.7 || 9.5 || 1.2 || 1.0 || 23.8 || 29.2
|-
! colspan=14 | EuroBasket
|-
| style="text-align:left;background:gold;"| 2017 
| style="text-align:left;"| Slovenia
| 9 || 9 || 29.1 || .406 || .311 || .848 || 8.1 || 3.6 || .9 || .3 || 14.3 || 18.7
|-
|}

NBA achievements

Regular season
First teenager to record four career triple-doubles in NBA history.
Broke Jason Kidd's Mavericks franchise record (21) of most triple-doubles with 22 in just 122 NBA games.
Most triple-doubles in a season (17) before turning 22 years old (2019–20 season). Previously held by Ben Simmons (12 in 201718).
Youngest player in NBA history to lead the league outright in triple-doubles (21 years, 168 days old). Previously held by Magic Johnson.
Twenty straight games with at least 20 points, 5 rebounds, and 5 assists, the most since the 1976–77 ABANBA merger. Previously held by Michael Jordan with 18 consecutive games.
First player since Tim Duncan to be selected to All-NBA First Team in a player's first or second season.
Second-fewest games played to record 35 career triple-doubles (190). Previously held by Magic Johnson (204).
Third-fewest games played to reach 4,000 career points since the ABANBA merger (Michael Jordan, Shaquille O’Neal).
First player in NBA history to record:
 a 60-point, 20 rebound triple-double (60 points, 21 rebounds, 10 assists).
 250 points, 50 rebounds, and 50 assists in a five game span.
 a 30-point triple-double (35 points, 12 rebounds, 10 assists) as a teenager.
 two triple-doubles before the age of 20.
 a 35-point triple-double in a game with 26 minutes or fewer played (35 points, 10 rebounds, and 11 assists in 25:30).
 30+ points, 10+ rebounds, and 15+ assists in a game with 30 minutes or fewer played (31 points, 12 rebounds, and 15 assists in 30:05).
 36+ points, 14+ rebounds, and 19+ assists in a game (regular season or playoffs).
 multiple 30-point triple-doubles in games with 30 minutes or fewer played.
multiple 40-point triple-doubles before turning 21 years old.
over 20 career triple-doubles at age 21 or younger.
ten career 35-point triple-doubles before turning 22 years old.
200+ points, 50+ rebounds, and 50+ assists through the first six games of a season. 
Second player in NBA history to:
average 21+ points, 7+ rebounds, and 6+ assists per game in a rookie season (Oscar Robertson).
average 28 points, 9 rebounds, and 8 assists per game multiple seasons (Oscar Robertson).
record 20 points, 5 rebounds, and 5 assists in 50 of their first 100 career games (Oscar Robertson).
record 2,000+ points, 750+ rebounds, and 500+ assists in their first 100 career games (Oscar Robertson).
record 3,000+ points, 1,100+ rebounds, and 950+ assists in the first two seasons of their career (Oscar Robertson).
record 4,000+ points and 1,000+ assists before turning 22 years old (LeBron James).
record at least 35 points and 19 assists in a triple-double (Oscar Robertson).
record 10+ 30-point triple-doubles in the first two seasons of their career (Oscar Robertson).
record a 30+ point, 20+ rebound triple-double, and a 30+ point, 20+ assist triple-double (Oscar Robertson).
record 25 career triple-doubles in the first two seasons of their career (Oscar Robertson).
score 30 or more points in the first eight games of a season (Wilt Chamberlain).
Third player in NBA history to:
average at least 28 points, 9 rebounds, and 8 assists in a season (Oscar Robertson, Russell Westbrook).
record at least 12 30-point triple-doubles in a season (Oscar Robertson, Russell Westbrook).
record 30+ points, 10+ rebounds, and 19+ assists in multiple games (Oscar Robertson, Magic Johnson).
record 40 triple-doubles in their first four seasons (Oscar Robertson, Magic Johnson).
Fourth player in NBA history to record:
at least 35 points and 19 assists in a game (Oscar Robertson, Tiny Archibald, Kevin Johnson).
34+ points, 20+ rebounds, and 12+ assists in a game (Elgin Baylor, Wilt Chamberlain, Kareem Abdul-Jabbar).
30+ points, 10+ rebounds, and 20+ assists in a game (Oscar Robertson, Magic Johnson, Russell Westbrook).
35+ points, 15+ rebounds, and 15+ assists in a game (Oscar Robertson, Wilt Chamberlain, James Harden).
25+ points, 15+ rebounds, and 15+ assists in multiple games (Oscar Robertson, Wilt Chamberlain, Larry Bird).
at least 27 points, 7 rebounds, and 8 assists per game in multiple seasons (Oscar Robertson, LeBron James, Russell Westbrook).
Fifth player in NBA history to average:
at least 20 points, 5 rebounds, and 5 assists in a rookie season (Oscar Robertson, Michael Jordan, LeBron James, Tyreke Evans).
a 30-point triple-double in a ten-game span (Oscar Robertson, Michael Jordan, Russell Westbrook, LeBron James).
Youngest player in NBA history to record:
three triple-doubles.
20 points, 15 rebounds, and 15 assists in a game.
30 points, 10 rebounds, and 20 assists in a game (22 years, 62 days old).
30 points, 20 rebounds, and 10 assists in a game (21 years, 158 days old).
35 points, 10 rebounds, and 15 assists in a game (21 years, 162 days old). Previously held by Michael Jordan.
35-point triple-doubles in succession, breaking Oscar Robertson's record.

Playoffs
 NBA record 42 points in an NBA playoff debut.
First player in NBA history to record:
43+ points, 17+ rebounds, and 13+ assists in a playoff game.
three triple-doubles in their first seven career playoff games.
multiple 30-point triple-doubles at the age of 22 or younger.
250+ points, 70+ rebounds, and 70+ assists through their first eight career playoff games.
Second player in NBA history to record:
70 total points in their first two career playoff games (George Mikan, 75 points in 1949).
two triple-doubles in their first four career playoff games (Magic Johnson).
40+ points, and 14+ assists in a playoff game (LeBron James).

Third player in NBA history to record:
40+ points, 15+ rebounds, and 10+ assists in a playoff game (Oscar Robertson, Charles Barkley).
300+ points through their first nine career playoff games (Kareem Abdul-Jabbar, Michael Jordan).
 900+ points through their first 28 career playoff games (Michael Jordan, Wilt Chamberlain).
Fifth player in NBA history to:
have 40+ points and hit a buzzer-beater in a playoff game (Michael Jordan, LeBron James, Kawhi Leonard, Damian Lillard).
average at least 30 points, 8 rebounds, and 8 assists in a playoff series (Oscar Robertson, Michael Jordan, Russell Westbrook, LeBron James).
record 44+ points, 9+ rebounds, and 9+ assists in a playoff game (Magic Johnson, Michael Jordan, Russell Westbrook, LeBron James).
 Youngest player in NBA history to:
hit a playoff buzzer-beater at 21 years and 177 days old.
record a 40-point triple-double in a playoff game.

Personal life
Dončić can speak four languages: Slovenian, Serbian, English, and Spanish. He learned Spanish after joining Real Madrid.

In 2017, while playing at Real Madrid, Dončić signed a two-year deal with Nike. In December 2019, it was announced that Dončić had signed a multi-year endorsement deal with Air Jordan. On July 14, 2021, it was announced that Dončić would be the cover athlete for NBA 2K22, the 23rd installment in the NBA 2K video game series. 

His 2018–19 Panini National Treasures basketball card sold for $4.6 million dollars in 2021.

See also
 List of National Basketball Association career triple-double leaders
 List of National Basketball Association single-game scoring leaders
 List of youngest EuroLeague players
 List of European basketball players in the United States

Notes

References

External links

Luka Dončić at acb.com 

Luka Dončić at euroleague.net

Luka Dončić at realmadrid.com

1999 births
Living people
Atlanta Hawks draft picks
Basketball players at the 2020 Summer Olympics
Dallas Mavericks players
FIBA EuroBasket-winning players
Liga ACB players
National Basketball Association All-Stars
National Basketball Association players from Slovenia
Olympic basketball players of Slovenia
Point guards
Real Madrid Baloncesto players
Shooting guards
Slovenian expatriate basketball people in Spain
Slovenian expatriate basketball people in the United States
Slovenian men's basketball players
Slovenian people of Serbian descent
Small forwards
Basketball players from Ljubljana